Alexander Gulyavtsev (born 3 May 1978) is a Russian former professional ice hockey winger who last competitively with Avtomobilist Yekaterinburg of the KHL. He is currently the general manager of Molot-Prikamye Perm of the VHL.

Gulyavtsev joined Khabarovsk as the head coach in the midst of the 2018–19 season, after previously being fired from former club Severstal Cherepovets on November 12, 2018.

Career statistics

Regular season and playoffs

International

References

External links

1973 births
Living people
Avtomobilist Yekaterinburg players
Russian ice hockey right wingers
Metallurg Magnitogorsk players
Molot-Prikamye Perm players
HC Neftekhimik Nizhnekamsk players
Severstal Cherepovets players
Sportspeople from Perm, Russia